Group C of the 2012 Africa Cup of Nations ran from 23 January until 31 January. It consisted of Gabon, Morocco, Niger and Tunisia. The matches were held in Gabon. Gabon and Tunisia progressed to the quarterfinals.

Standings

All times are West Africa Time (UTC+1).

Gabon vs. Niger

Assistant referees:
Aboubacar Doumbouya (Guinea)
Aden Range Marwa (Kenya)
Fourth official:
Bakary Gassama (Gambia)

Morocco vs. Tunisia

Assistant referees:
Peter Edibe (Nigeria)
Zakhele Siwela (South Africa)
Fourth official:
Janny Sikazwe (Zambia)

Niger vs. Tunisia

Assistant referees:
Angesom Ogbamariam (Eritrea)
Balkrishna Bootun (Mauritius)
Fourth official:
Neant Alioum (Cameroon)

Gabon vs. Morocco

Assistant referees:
Songuifolo Yeo (Ivory Coast)
Felicien Kabanda (Rwanda)
Fourth official:
Noumandiez Doué (Ivory Coast)

Gabon vs. Tunisia

Assistant referees:
Evarist Menkouande (Cameroon)
Yanoussa Moussa (Cameroon)
Fourth official:
Eddy Maillet (Seychelles)

Niger vs. Morocco

Assistant referees:
Jason Damoo (Seychelles)
Marwa Range (Kenya)
Fourth official:
Neant Alioum (Cameroon)

References

External links
Official website

2012 Africa Cup of Nations